Khosrow Beyk Rural District is a rural district (dehestan) in Milajerd District, Komijan County, Markazi Province, Iran. At the 2006 census, its population was 6,398, in 1,628 families. The rural district has 18 villages.

References 

Rural Districts of Markazi Province
Komijan County